Bar Aftab-e Ali Momen (also Romanized as Bar Āftāb-e ‘Alī Mo’men) is a village in Donbaleh Rud-e Jonubi Rural District, Dehdez District, Izeh County, Khuzestan Province, Iran. At the 2006 census, its population was 167, in 29 families.

References 

Populated places in Izeh County